Woman's Law is a 1927 American silent drama film directed by Dallas M. Fitzgerald and starring Pat O'Malley, Lillian Rich and Audrey Ferris.

Cast
 Pat O'Malley as Trooper Bucky O'Hare 
 Lillian Rich as Helene 
 Ernest Wood as Vaughan Neil 
 John Cossar as John Collon 
 Harold Miller as Philip Harley 
 Edward Cecil as Inspetor Steele 
 Audrey Ferris as Rose La Pierre 
 Sam Allen as Jules La Pierre

References

Bibliography
 Munden, Kenneth White. The American Film Institute Catalog of Motion Pictures Produced in the United States, Part 1. University of California Press, 1997.

External links
 

1927 films
1927 drama films
1920s English-language films
American silent feature films
Silent American drama films
Films directed by Dallas M. Fitzgerald
American black-and-white films
1920s American films